= Satyro Taboada =

Brazilian footballer

Personal information
- Full name: Satyro Taboada
- Date of birth: 19 November 1900
- Place of birth: Belo Horizonte, Brazil
- Date of death: 26 July 1972 (aged 71)
- Place of death: Belo Horizonte, Brazil
- Position: Forward

Senior career*
Years	Team	Apps	(Gls)
1920–1921	Sete de Setembro-MG		
1922–1935	América Mineiro		
1926	→ Cruzeiro (loan)		
- * Club domestic league appearances and goals as of 19 March 2024

Satyro Taboada (19 November 1900 – 26 July 1972), was a Brazilian professional footballer who played as a forward.

== Career ==
América Mineiro's all-time top scorer with 170 goals, Satyro is considered the first great idol in the club's history. He was state champion four times for the club and top scorer in 1923 and 1924, and scored 9 goals in a single match, against Palmeiras-MG in 1928. After retiring as a player, Taboada became a referee in Minas Gerais football.

He died on July 26, 1972, from a heart attack, and was buried with an América Mineiro flag over his coffin.

== Honours ==
América Mineiro

- Campeonato Mineiro: 1922, 1923, 1924, 1925

Individual

- Campeonato Mineiro top scorer: 1923, 1924
